Mount Heemskirk is a mountain in Western Tasmania, west of the West Coast Range. The closest town is Zeehan, about 14 kilometres (9 mi) away.

History
The indigenous Peerapper name for the mountain is recorded as Roeinrim or Traoota munatta.

European naming
On 24 November 1642, Dutch explorer Abel Tasman became the first European explorer to sight and document the Heemskirk and West Coast Range. Tasman sailed his ships close to the coastal area which today encompasses the Southwest Conservation Area, south of Macquarie Harbour, but was unable to send a landing party ashore due to poor weather and did not make contact with any South West Tasmanian groups. In their circumnavigation of Tasmania between 1798–99, George Bass and Matthew Flinders named the mountains Mount Heemskirk and Mount Zeehan after Tasman’s ships, the warship Heemskerck (Old Dutch for "Home Church") and the 200 tone fluyt Zeehaen (Old Dutch for "Sea Rooster") in honour of Tasman's voyage of exploration. Although Dutch in origin, Bass and Flinder's Anglicised naming of Mount Heemskirk and Mount Zeehan created some of the oldest British place names in Tasmania. Only a few Dutch place names in Tasmania originate from Tasman's 1642 voyage. Most place names were not assigned in Van Diemen's Land until after the settlement of Hobart Town at Risdon Cove in 1803, although some place names originate from Bruni d'Entrecasteaux's French expedition in 1792. It was not until after the 1815 discovery of Macquarie Harbour by explorer and mariner James Kelly that many place names on the West Coast were assigned. In the 1880s, the high ground around Mount Heemskirk was allocated the term Heemskirk Range.

Mining
The mountain and its surrounding high ground was also known as the Heemskirk mining area in the 1890s and the first decade of the 1900s.

Tourism
After the success of mountain biking in Derby, several mountain bike trails opened on Mount Heemskirk in 2020.

References

Heemskirk
Western Tasmania